The  Denver Dynamite season was the third season for the Arena Football League franchise. With the same coaching staff in place from 1989, the Dynamite got off to a hot 4–1 start during the 1990 season. The attendance had been steadily rising during the season, with the final home game's attendance listed at 10,587. This included approximately 3,000 people who were admitted for free. The Dynamite would finish the season with a record of 4–4, good enough to clinch the 3rd seed. The team lost 25–26 to the semi-finals to the Dallas Texans.

Regular season

Schedule

Standings

Playoffs

Roster

Awards

References

External links
 1990 Denver Dynamite page at ArenaFan.com

Denver Dynamite
Denver Dynamite
Denver Dynamite (arena football) seasons